Johan Verbeke (born 9 July 1951) is a Belgian diplomat, the former Belgian Ambassador to the United States until 2016.

Early life 
Verbeke holds a Master of Laws (LL.M.) from the Yale Law School and a Diplôme d’Etudes Supérieures Européennes (D.E.S.) from the Université de Nancy.

Career 
Verbeke joined the Belgian Ministry of Foreign Affairs in 1981 and has served in various capacities for his country's foreign service, including as Chairman of the Security Council Sanctions Committees on Côte d'Ivoire, Iran and Al Qaida/Taliban, leader of the Security Council Mission to Kosovo (April 2007), Facilitator of the President of the General Assembly for the negotiation of General Assembly-resolutions on Millennium Development Goals-implementation and Economic and Social Council-reform (2005–2006), Personal Representative of the Minister of Foreign Affairs for Counter-Terrorism (2003), Special Envoy of the Prime Minister to the New Partnership for Africa's Development (NEPAD) (2002–2005). Verbeke worked in the Ministry as the Deputy Director General for Political Affairs and as the Deputy Chief of Mission in Washington, D.C. Since then, he was the Chef de Cabinet of the Ministry of Foreign Affairs.

Verbeke was the permanent representative of Belgium to the United Nations and to its Security Council. He was briefly the UN special coordinator for Lebanon, serving as the United Nations Secretary General's representative in Lebanon. When he served as Permanent Representative of Belgium to the United Nations, he presented his credentials to the United Nations Secretary-General on 16 September 2004. Later, Verbeke was the Secretary-General's Special Representative and Head of the UN Observer Mission in Georgia (UNOMIG) in 2008–09.

From 2010 until 2014, Verbeke was the Belgian Ambassador to the United Kingdom.

As of January 2014, Johan Verbeke is the Belgian Ambassador to the United States in Washington, D.C.

Offices held

References

External links 
The United Nations list of current heads of missions (PDF)
The biography of Johan Verbeke at the Permanent Mission of Belgium to the United Nations
CV Ambassador Johan Verbeke

Living people
1951 births
Belgian politicians
Belgian diplomats
Permanent Representatives of Belgium to the United Nations
Ambassadors of Belgium to the United Kingdom
Yale Law School alumni
Nancy-Université alumni
Ambassadors of Belgium to the United States